The 1938 Tschammerpokal was the 4th season of the annual German football cup competition. For the first time, Austrian teams competed in the competition due to the Anschluss by Nazi Germany at the beginning of the year. In the final, which was held on 8 January 1939 at the Olympiastadion in Berlin, Austrian club Rapid Wien defeated FSV Frankfurt 3–1.

Matches

First round

Replay

Second round

Round of 16

Quarter-finals
In the quarter-finals, the eight German teams (Altreich) were paired internally in an elimination round. The eight teams from Austria (now called Ostmark due to the Anschluss) were also paired in an internal elimination round. The winners then met in a joint quarter-final round. The pairings were entirely random.

Altreich elimination

Ostmark elimination

Joint quarter-finals

Semi-finals

Final

References

External links
 Official site of the DFB 
 Kicker.de 
 Tschammerpokal at Fussballberichte.de 

1938
1938 in German football cups